Georgy Alexandrovich Avenarius (1903–1958) was one of the founders of Soviet film criticism.

He was born in a family of intellectuals, and was interested in movie art from the early ages. Avenarius finished the Odessa Actor's studio, then acted in Ukrainian films like "Spartak" (1926), "Taras Tryasilo" (1926) etc. by Perestiani and Chardynin. In 1930, he finished the Odessa film collage, worked as cameramen with Dovzhenko and taught courses in Soviet and foreign film history and theory at Kiev film-institute. Avenarius published his first film-analyses in "Radianskoe kino" and "Proletarskoe kino" journals in 1930's. In 1936, Sergei Eisenstein invited him to Moscow, to organize new courses of Foreign film history at VGIK all-Soviet institute. He also organized the foreign film collection at all-Soviet Fund of films. 

Avenarius is an author of many researches, monographs and textbooks. He was known as a specialist on Charles Chaplin's early period.

One of the central streets of the Domodedovsky District, where the Gosfilmofond is located, is named after Georgy Avenarius.

References

1903 births
1958 deaths
Academic staff of the Gerasimov Institute of Cinematography
Soviet film critics
Film theorists
Soviet television presenters